St. Louis Union Station is a National Historic Landmark and former train station in St. Louis, Missouri. At its 1894 opening, the station was the largest in the world that had tracks and passenger service areas all on one level. Traffic peaked at 100,000 people a day in the 1940s. The last Amtrak passenger train left the station in 1978.

In the 1980s, it was renovated as a hotel, shopping center, and entertainment complex. The 2010s and 2020s saw more renovation and expansion of entertainment and office capacity. The current hotel portion of the station is currently a member of Historic Hotels of America, the official program of the National Trust for Historic Preservation.

An adjacent station serves the light-rail MetroLink Red and Blue Lines, which run under the station in the Union Station subway tunnel. The city's intercity train station sits a quarter-mile to the south, serving MetroLink, Amtrak, and Greyhound Bus.

History

19th century

The station was opened on September 1, 1894, by the Terminal Railroad Association of St. Louis. The station was designed by Theodore Link, and included three main areas: the Headhouse and the Midway, and the  Train Shed designed by civil engineer George H. Pegram. The headhouse originally housed a hotel, a restaurant, passenger waiting rooms and railroad ticketing offices. It featured a gold-leafed Grand Hall, Romanesque arches, a  barrel-vaulted ceiling and stained-glass windows.

Union Station's headhouse and midway are constructed of Indiana limestone and initially included 32 tracks under its vast trainshed terminating in the stub-end terminal. Its Grand Hall, which cost around $6.5 million and was about 75 by 125 feet large, was considered to be one of the most beautiful public lobbies.

At its opening, it was the world's largest and busiest railroad station and its trainshed was the largest roof span in the world.

20th century
In 1903, Union Station was expanded to accommodate visitors to the 1904 St. Louis World's Fair.  In the 1920s, it remained the largest American railroad terminal.

At its height, the station combined the St. Louis passenger services of 22 railroads, the most of any single terminal in the world. In the 1940s, it handled 100,000 passengers a day. The famous photograph of Harry S. Truman holding aloft the erroneous Chicago Tribune headline, "Dewey Defeats Truman", was shot at the station as Truman headed back to Washington, D.C., from Independence, Missouri, after the 1948 Presidential election.

The 1940s expansion added a new ticket counter designed as a half-circle and a mural by Louis Grell could be found atop the customer waiting area which depicted the history of St. Louis with an old fashion steam engine, two large steamboats and the Eads Bridge in the background.

As airliners became the primary mode of long-distance travel and railroad passenger services declined in the 1950s and 1960s, the massive station became obsolete and too expensive to maintain for its original purpose. By 1961, several tracks had been paved over for parking. Amtrak took over passenger service in 1971, but abandoned Union Station on October 31, 1978. By then, Amtrak had cut back service to four routes per day–the State House, the Ann Rutledge, the National Limited (formerly the Spirit of St. Louis) and the Inter-American. The eight total trains were nowhere near enough to justify the use of such a large facility. The last train to leave Union Station was a Chicago-bound Inter-American. Passenger service shifted to a temporary-style "Amshack" two blocks east. Amtrak has since moved its St. Louis service to the Gateway Transportation Center, one block east of Union Station.

The station was designated a National Historic Landmark in 1970, as an important surviving example of large-scale railroad architecture from the late 19th century. It was designated as a National Historic Civil Engineering Landmark by the American Society of Civil Engineers in 1981.

In August 1985, after a $150 million renovation designed by HOK, Union Station was reopened with a 539-room hotel, shopping mall, restaurants and food court. Federal historic rehabilitation tax credits were used to transform Union Station into one of the city's most visited attractions. The station rehabilitation by Conrad Schmitt Studios remains one of the largest adaptive re-use projects in the United States. The hotel is housed in the headhouse and part of the train shed, which also houses a lake and shopping, entertainment and dining establishments. Omni Hotels was the original hotel operator, followed by Hyatt Regency Hotel chain and Marriott Hotels.

21st century

In 2010–11, the station's Marriott Hotel in the main terminal building was expanded. It took over the station's Midway area; all stores were moved to the train shed shopping arcade. In 2012, Lodging Hospitality Management bought Union Station and rebranded the hotel as a DoubleTree. In August 2016, Lodging Hospitality Management announced plans to renovate Union Station once again, included plans for an aquarium. The Memories Museum features artifacts and displays about the history of St. Louis Union Station and rail travel in the United States. Located on the upper level of the train shed, the museum is a joint project of Union Station Associates and the National Museum of Transportation. The original architectural drawings and blueprints for Union Station and the original hotel are available to researchers at the Washington University Archives at Washington University in St. Louis. Some architectural elements from the building have been removed in renovations and taken to the Sauget, Illinois, storage site of the National Building Arts Center.

St. Louis Union Station was the venue for the FIRST Tech Challenge World Championship component of the FIRST Championship, hosted in St. Louis every April until 2017, after which it was moved to Detroit.

Today, the station is home to the St. Louis Aquarium. At 120,000 square feet, the aquarium is home to more than 13,000 animals representing over 250 species.

The station's train shed area features The St. Louis Wheel, a 200-foot-high, 42 gondola observation wheel.

Inside the station is The St. Louis Rope Course, a 90,000 cubic foot, 3-story indoor ropes and zip line course.

Union Station has two light show features: one in the train shed area, and another inside Union Station Hotel's lobby.

In January 2020, Build-A-Bear Workshop, Inc. moved their global headquarters to downtown St. Louis inside the 68,000-square-foot Grand Central Building inside the Union Station complex. The company also opened their new Build-A-Bear Workshop Union Station headquarters store and also operates a Build-A-Bear Radio studio and other experiential elements at their new headquarters. Additionally, a ferris wheel, aquarium, and an abundance of restaurants have been added to Union Station in 2020.

Transportation

MetroLink (subway/rail)

MetroLink, the St. Louis rail mass transit system, serves Union Station from its station directly below the trainshed in the Union Station subway tunnel.
The St. Louis Union Station serves the Red Line and Blue Line.

It takes about 30 minutes to travel to Lambert-St. Louis International Airport's East and Main Terminals via the Metro Red Line.

MegaBus service
Megabus previously provided express intercity bus service to Memphis, Tennessee, Kansas City, Missouri and Chicago from Union Station.  Megabus moved to the Gateway Multimodal Transportation Center in December, 2014.

Taxi and rideshare
St. Louis Union Station has 24-hour taxi service at its north entrance on Market Street.

Gateway Transportation Station
The city's major transportation hub station, Gateway Multimodal Transportation Center is located next to Union Station.  It serves the city's rail system and regional bus system MetroBus, Greyhound, Amtrak and city taxi services.

Filming
In 1981, the disused Grand Hall was used in John Carpenter's movie Escape from New York, during the film's gladiatorial fight.

Gallery

See also
List of railway stations

References

Further reading

The St. Louis Union Station: a monograph by the architect and officers of the Terminal Railroad Association of St. Louis.

External links

Transportation buildings and structures in St. Louis
Chicago and Eastern Illinois Railroad
Clock towers in Missouri
Saint Louis
Former railway stations in Missouri
Historic American Engineering Record in Missouri
Historic Civil Engineering Landmarks
History of St. Louis
Landmarks of St. Louis
Saint Louis
Museums in St. Louis
National Historic Landmarks in Missouri
Rail in St. Louis
Railway hotels in the United States
Railway stations on the National Register of Historic Places in Missouri
Saint Louis
Romanesque Revival architecture in Missouri
Shopping districts and streets in the United States
Saint Louis
Saint Louis
Saint Louis
Saint Louis
Saint Louis
Saint Louis
Saint Louis
Saint Louis
Stations along Southern Railway lines in the United States
Saint Louis
Former New York, Chicago and St. Louis Railroad stations
Saint Louis
Saint Louis
Towers in Missouri
Saint Louis
Tourist attractions in St. Louis
Railroad-related National Historic Landmarks
Railroad museums in Missouri
National Register of Historic Places in St. Louis
Art Nouveau architecture in Missouri
Art Nouveau railway stations
Downtown West, St. Louis
Saint Louis
Saint Louis
1894 establishments in Missouri